Cidade Baixa (English: Lower City) may refer to:

Cidade Baixa, the Portuguese-language title of Lower City, a 2005 Brazilian film
Cidade Baixa, Rio Grande do Sul, a neighbourhood in Porto Alegre, Brazil
Cidade Baixa, the lower half of the city of Salvador, Bahia in Brazil

See also
Lower City (disambiguation)